Due marines e un generale (translated: Two Marines and a General, internationally released as War Italian Style) is a 1965 Italian comedy film directed by Luigi Scattini. The film puts together the famous Italian comic duo Franco and Ciccio, and the silent cinema icon Buster Keaton.

The Keaton role is a mute role, except for the words "Thank you" that he pronounces in the final scene of the film.

Premise
Two US Marines who are so incompetent that they are sent to the European Theatre of Operations end up in the Battle of Anzio where they face the German's giant artillery piece "Anzio Annie".

Cast 
 Franco Franchi as Frank
 Ciccio Ingrassia as Joe
 Buster Keaton as Gen. von Kassler
 Martha Hyer as Lt. Inge Schultze
 Fred Clark as Gen. Zacharias
 Barbara Lory as Inger
 Franco Ressel as Col. Jaeger 
 Lino Banfi as German Soldier

References

External links

1960s buddy comedy films
Italian buddy comedy films
Films directed by Luigi Scattini
Films scored by Piero Umiliani
Italian Campaign of World War II films
Military humor in film
Macaroni Combat films
Films about the United States Marine Corps
Italian World War II films
1960s Italian-language films
1965 films
American International Pictures films
1960s Italian films